Nagat El-Sagheera (born Nagah   Hosni Elbaba on 11 August 1938; alternative spelling: El Saghirah) is an Egyptian singer and actress. She retired from filming in 1976 and from singing in 2002. Nagat began her career at the age of five and retired 59 years later.

Nagat's works are a part of Egyptian music from the "golden age" of the 1940s, ’50s and ’60s. She still inspires other Arab artists.

Early life
Nagat El Sagheera was born in Cairo, Egypt on 11 August 1938. The daughter of prominent Arabic calligrapher, Mohammad Hosni, He is originally from Mit Ghamr, Dakahlia Governorate, Egypt; and an Egyptian mother. Her father married twice. She grew up in a household that was frequented by leading artists and calligraphers. Najat was singing at family gatherings from the age of five. She made her first film, Hadiya (released in 1947) at the age of eight.

She is reported to have performed songs by the diva, Umm Kulthum, from the age of 7 years. Along with Umm Kulthum, she was one of a small group of female singers who formed the Egyptian “golden age” of music in the 1940s, ’50s and ’60s.

She was known as “al-Saghira, the small” or “al-Saghira, the young”. She gained many fans after releasing the song, Irja Ilyya (Return to Me), based on a poem by Nizar Qabbani whose sister had committed suicide rather than enter into an arranged marriage. The song's feminist lyrics struck a chord with fans. During the 1970s, Najat added original lines to the song during 1970s’ performances, demonstrating her capacity for "inspired interpretation".

In a recorded interview, in the mid-1960s for Egyptian TV with the presenter Ms Salwa Hegzi, Nagat stated that she had, at that time, eight brothers and sisters. Lately, some media outlets are indicating double that number; the most frequently mentioned is seventeen brothers and sisters. The discrepancy between eight and seventeen siblings can be readily explained by the nature of an extended family. Najat is one of eight siblings (four boys: Ezz Eddin, Nabil, Farooq and Sami; and four girls: Khadiga, Samira, Najat herself and Afaf) from her father's first marriage; as well as three half-sisters from her father's second marriage to Gawhara (Kawther, Soad, Sabah). Following Gawhara's divorce from Hosni and remarriage to Abdel Monem Hafez, another six children were born (three boys: Jaheer, Jaser and Jalaa; and three girls: Gehan, Janjah and Jeely). The grand total of 17 is made up of eight full siblings; three half-sisters and six step-siblings. In the same interview, Nagat confirmed that she was brought up in a home where most of her brothers and sisters were artists.

Home of artists
Her father's household was known as "the home of the Artists". Leading artists from across the Arab world regularly visited Hosni's home in Khan el-Khalili, Cairo. He nurtured his children's talents and encouraged them to pursue careers in the performing and visual arts. Many of his children became artists in their own rights. His son, Ezz Eddin Hosni (1927–2013) was a noted composer and taught Najat music and singing. Another brother, son Sami Hosni became a Cello player, jewellery designer and calligrapher. Yet another brother, Farooq, was a painter and his daughter, Samira, also became an actress. The Egyptian actress Soad Hosni (1943–2001) was Najat's half-sister. Soad died in London under controversial circumstances. Her funeral was attended by some 10,000 people. Soad Hosni performed in more than 80 films the last of which was released in 1991, and had five marriages and no children.

Marriages
Nagat had two marriages. Her first marriage was at young age, in 1955, when she was 16 (or 17) years old to an Egyptian man called Kamal Mansi who was a friend of her brother. She was divorced around 1960 and remarried in 1967. Nagat also divorced from her second husband, Egyptian film director Houssam El-Din Mustafa (1926–2000), shortly afterwards and has remained single to date. Media reports suggest that she made a decision to devote her life to raising her only child, Waleed, from her first marriage, and to her work.

Vocal development and style
In the first 10 years of her singing career Nagat imitated other singers. Renowned Egyptian journalist Fekry Abaza (1896–1979) demanded the State should support the young gifted Nagat. According to her family that period "trained" her voice. However, in 1949, the iconic Egyptian music composer Mohamed Abdel wahab (1902–1991) actually filed an official complaint at the Police station against Nagat's father. He claimed that such training hindered the natural process of her voice development and that she should be left alone to develop freely without it.

Nagat broke away from imitating other singers when she released her own first song in 1955 at the age of 16 years. In the above-mentioned 1960s interview, Nagat herself indicated her first song was "Why did you allow me to love you?" Thereafter she released several other songs for Radio stations. Each song had duration of 7 to 8 minutes. She began to deliver "long-duration" songs. Each of these songs tells a story and each typically lasts for some 20–40 minutes in studio recordings. To hold onto her audience for the longer durations on stage Nagat turned her attention to people like Nizar Qabbani. His classic poetic styles combine simplicity and elegance in exploring themes of love and feminism. She has sung at least four of his poems, all of which were composed by Abdul Wahab.

These long duration songs were highly successful. Her rigorous training, lengthy rehearsals in the recording studios and tireless performance on the stage are legendary. In total, Nagat El Sagheera may have recorded more than 200 songs; top 53 of which are available on Apple's iTunes web site

She built on this success in subsequent years, despite the difficulty of finding new outstanding poems and corresponding music compositions. To combat this shortage, she was forced to rely on her own abilities in performance. For example, in 1976, at the age of 37, she performed several songs in her last film "Dried Tears". One of these songs was "Mata?" derived from the poem written by Nizar Qabbani with music by Abdul Wahab. The duration of this song in the film was less than ten minutes. In the years that followed, Nagat sang it several times on stage; the last time was in 2002. One of those repeats was in the 1980s when she was in her 40s. In this performance, she extended the delivery of this song from below 10 minutes in the film to about one hour on the stage. Many consider this specific performance on the stage one of her lifetime bests. It was recorded and can be easily found on YouTube.

Recognition and legacy
Nagat's stage performances are at the core of her legacy. Kamal Al Taweel (1922–2003), one of her distinguished collaborators, indicated in a TV interview that as far as music composers were concerned Najat Al Saghira was the best performer in the Arab world. This indication tallies with the position of her core fans who place her as No.1 in the Arab world. That is ahead of Umm Kulthum (1898–1975) who is still widely regarded by many as the greatest Arabic singer in history.

Mohamed Abdel Wahab, the most prominent 20th-century Egyptian composer, felt his works were safest with Nagat. He described her as "the owner of the loud silence"!

Nizar Qabbani (1923–1998) a Syrian diplomat and one of the most revered contemporary poets in the Arab world said in a TV interview that he hoped to attract some 15 thousand readers when he published a book of poetry, but when Najat sang one of his poems it attracted millions in the Arab-speaking world. He also said “… I believe she (Nagat) is the best among those who sang and expressed my poems”.

Nagat’s 1960s–1970s songs, including those in films and stage performances are the core of her legacy. Her stage performances popularity remained undiminished right up to her retirement in 2002.

In 2006, she was awarded the Owais Cultural Award in recognition of her leading artistic career in the world of song.

Films
Nagat starred in 13 Egyptian movies then retired from acting in 1976 at the age of only 37. Her most prominent film is Ezz El-Dine Zulficar's Black Candles. Nearly, all of her films contained songs performed by her, and one of her most popular songs ever is an Egyptian rural dialect song called "Ama Barawa".

The best of these films are those where she has the starring role (top five of listed films below are available on YouTube);

 1958: Stranger
 1962: Black Candles
 1966: Beach of Fun 
 1969: Seven Days in Heaven 
 1971: My Dear Daughter 
 1976: Dried Tears

Music
Several of the Arabic music composers of the 20th century worked with Nagat El Sahgeera such as;
 
 Mohamed Abdel Wahab (1902–1991) who composed her best hits including "Do not lie", "In the hour when I see you beside me" and "Mata?”
 Kamal El Taweel (1922–2003) who composed "Live with me”
 Baleegh Hamdi (1932–1993) who composed "I am waiting for you".
 Sayed Mekawy (1927–1997) who composed "It makes a big difference".
 Mohammad El Mougi (1923–1995) who composed "Eyes of the heart".
 Mahmood El Sherif (1912–1990) who in 1955 composed for her the brilliant song "Thirsty" on loving the Nile river which was written by Morsi Jameel Aziz.
 Ezz Eddin Hosni (1927–2013) (Nagat's brother) who composed for her "On your wing my bird I will tie my message" which was written by Mohammad Al Bahteeti.
 Composers of other songs: Riad Al Sunbati (1906–1981), Hilmy Bakr (born 1937) as well as Zakariyya Ahmad (1896–1961).
 Appears in the sountrack: Moon Knight (2022).

Words

The list of song-writing collaborators may have been even longer than that for music.

Nagat El Sagheera kick-started the sixties decade with her first long-duration song "Does he think I am a toy in his two hands? (or in short Arabic:  “Ayadhonu”)”.  It was written by Nizar Qabbani with music by Abdul Wahab. There is an interesting photo of an archived 1960 letter circulating in the media, addressed to Najat Al Saghira and hand-written by Nizar when he was in China on a diplomatic mission. In this letter he was pressing her to send him the recording of the song upon its release. It was his first with her and an immediate huge success.

Besides Nizar Qabbani, other famous Arabic poets and song writers of the 20th century also obliged Nagat; such as Maamoun Shennawi (1914–1994) who wrote "Your love is my life", his brother Kamal Shennawi (1908–1965) who wrote "Do not lie" and Abdel Rahman el-Abnudi who described her warm soft voice as "diamond-like".

Nagat, as she herself confirms in that 1960s interview, always sought quality in words. She was extremely cautious with and meticulous in her choice of her lyrics. One example is that she replaced several words in and even deleted possibly more than one line from “Mata?” the original poem by Nizar Qabbani before she agreed to perform it.

Competition
Nagat El Sagheera emerged at a time when the field was already crowded with formidable competitors. From the start of the Sixties, Nagat El Sagheera quickly became a category on her own; separate from all the others.

Awards

Nagat was honoured and given prizes many times.

 In 1960s, Egyptian President Gamal Abdul Nasser (1918–1970) awarded her a high ranking Medal.  
 She had, and still does have, many fans in Tunisia. Both Tunisian presidents Habib Bourguiba (1903–2000) and later on Zine El Abidine Ben Ali (born 1936) gave her awards. 
 In 1985, King Hussain of Jordan (1935–1999) gave her the First Degree Medal of Independence. 
 In 2006, some four years after her retirement, she won the prize for "Those Who Gave People Happiness" in Dubai. She was handed a Gold Medal and US$100,000.

Latest

Nagat El Sagheera has not been seen on screen or in public since 2006, and rather chose a religious and quiet life.

In 2010, a reporter confirmed that she still lives in her native Cairo but travels to London in summer for medical treatment.

In 2014, at the age of 74, she made a phone call to an Egyptian TV station. She was talking from Germany where she was receiving medical treatment.
 
In 2015 (January), Nagat El Sagheera refused substantial monetary offers from TV channels for her participation in a proposed TV series on her half-sister Soad Hosni.

In 2015 (spring), social media chatter indicated Nagat was receiving physiotherapy and there were some concerns about her health.

In 2022, appeared in the mini-series OST, Moon Knight.

See also
 :fr:Najet Essaghira

References

1938 births
Egyptian film actresses
20th-century Egyptian women singers
20th-century Egyptian actresses
Actresses from Cairo
Singers who perform in Egyptian Arabic
Singers who perform in Classical Arabic
Egyptian people of Kurdish descent
Living people
Singers from Cairo